From 1933 to 1945, Nazi Germany operated more than a thousand concentration camps on its own territory and in parts of German-occupied Europe.

The first camps were established in March 1933 immediately after Adolf Hitler became Chancellor of Germany. Following the 1934 purge of the SA, the concentration camps were run exclusively by the SS via the Concentration Camps Inspectorate and later the SS Main Economic and Administrative Office. Initially, most prisoners were members of the Communist Party of Germany, but as time went on different groups were arrested, including "habitual criminals", "asocials", and Jews. After the beginning of World War II, people from German-occupied Europe were imprisoned in the concentration camps. Following Allied military victories, the camps were gradually liberated in 1944 and 1945, although hundreds of thousands of prisoners died in the death marches.

More than 1,000 concentration camps (including subcamps) were established during the history of Nazi Germany and around 1.65 million people were registered prisoners in the camps at one point. Around a million died during their imprisonment. Many of the former camps have been turned into museums commemorating the victims of the Nazi regime, while the camp system has become a symbol of violence and terror.

Background

Concentration camps are conventionally held to have been invented by the British during the Second Boer War, but historian Dan Stone argues that there were precedents in other countries and that camps were "the logical extension of phenomena that had long characterized colonial rule". Although the word "concentration camp" has acquired the connotation of murder because of the Nazi concentration camps, the British camps in South Africa did not involve systematic murder. The German Empire also established concentration camps during the Herero and Namaqua genocide (1904–1907); the death rate of these camps was 45 percent, twice that of the British camps. 

During the First World War, eight to nine million prisoners of war were held in prisoner-of-war camps, some of them at locations which were later the sites of Nazi camps, such as Theresienstadt and Mauthausen. Many prisoners held by Germany died as a result of intentional withholding of food and dangerous working conditions in violation of the 1907 Hague Convention. In countries such as France, Belgium, Italy, Austria-Hungary, and Germany, civilians deemed to be of "enemy origin" were denaturalized. Hundreds of thousands were interned and subject to forced labor in harsh conditions. During the Armenian genocide perpetrated by the Ottoman Empire, Ottoman Armenians were held in camps during their deportation into the Syrian Desert. In postwar Germany, "unwanted foreigners"—primarily Eastern European Jews—were warehoused at Cottbus-Sielow and Stargard.

History

Early camps (1933–1934)

On 30 January 1933, Adolf Hitler became chancellor of Germany after striking a backroom deal with the previous chancellor, Franz von Papen. The Nazis had no plan for concentration camps prior to their seizure of power. The concentration camp system arose in the following months due to the desire to suppress tens of thousands of Nazi opponents in Germany. The Reichstag fire in February 1933 was the pretext for mass arrests. The Reichstag Fire Decree eliminated the right to personal freedom enshrined in the Weimar Constitution and provided a legal basis for detention without trial. The first camp was Nohra, established on 3 March 1933 in a school.

The number of prisoners in 1933–1934 is difficult to determine; historian Jane Caplan estimated it at 50,000, with arrests perhaps exceeding 100,000. Eighty percent of prisoners were members of the Communist Party of Germany and ten percent members of the Social Democratic Party of Germany. Many prisoners were released in late 1933, and after a Christmas amnesty, there were only a few dozen camps left. About 70 camps were established in 1933, in any convenient structure that could hold prisoners, including vacant factories, prisons, country estates, schools, workhouses, and castles. There was no national system; camps were operated by local police, SS, and SA, state interior ministries, or a combination of the above. The early camps in 1933–1934 were heterogenous and fundamentally differed from the post-1935 camps in organization, conditions, and the groups imprisoned.

Institutionalization (1934–1937)

On 26 June 1933, Himmler appointed Theodor Eicke the second commandant of Dachau, which became the model followed by other camps. Eicke drafted the Disciplinary and Penal Code, a manual which specified draconian punishments for disobedient prisoners. He also created a system of prisoner functionaries, which later developed into the camp elders, block elders, and kapo of later camps. In May 1934, Lichtenburg was taken over by the SS from the Prussian bureaucracy, marking the beginning of a transition set in motion by Heinrich Himmler, then chief of the Gestapo (secret police). Following the purge of the SA on 30 June 1934, in which Eicke took a leading role, the remaining SA-run camps were taken over by the SS. In December 1934, Eicke was appointed the first inspector of the Concentration Camps Inspectorate (IKL); only camps managed by the IKL were designated "concentration camps". 

In early 1934, the number of prisoners was still falling and it was uncertain if the system would continue to exist. By mid-1935, there were only five camps, holding 4,000 prisoners, and 13 employees at the central IKL office. At the same time, 100,000 people were imprisoned in German jails, a quarter of those for political offenses. Believing Nazi Germany to be imperiled by internal enemies, Himmler called for a war against the "organized elements of sub-humanity", including communists, socialists, Jews, Freemasons, and criminals. Himmler won Hitler's backing and was appointed Chief of German Police on 17 June 1936. Of the six SS camps operational as of mid-1936, only two (Dachau and Lichtenburg) still existed by 1938. In the place of the camps that closed down, Eicke opened new camps at Sachsenhausen (September 1936) and Buchenwald (July 1937). Unlike earlier camps, the newly opened camps were purpose-built, isolated from the population and the rule of law, enabling the SS to exert absolute power. Prisoners, who previously wore civilian clothes, were forced to wear uniforms with Nazi concentration camp badges. The number of prisoners began to rise again, from 4,761 on 1 November 1936 to 7,750 by the end of 1937.

Rapid expansion (1937–1939)

By the end of June 1938, the prisoner population had expanded threefold in the previous six months, to 24,000 prisoners. The increase was fueled by arrests of those considered habitual criminals or asocials. According to SS chief Heinrich Himmler, the "criminal" prisoners at concentration camps needed to be isolated from society because they had committed offenses of a sexual or violent nature. In fact, most of the criminal prisoners were working-class men who had resorted to petty theft to support their families. Nazi raids of perceived asocials, including the arrest of 10,000 people in June 1938, targeted homeless people and the mentally ill, as well as the unemployed. Although the Nazis had previously targeted social outsiders, the influx of new prisoners meant that political prisoners became a minority.

To house the new prisoners, three new camps were established: Flossenbürg (May 1938) near the Czechoslovak border, Mauthausen (August 1938) in territory annexed from Austria, and Ravensbrück (May 1939) the first purpose-built camp for female prisoners. The mass arrests were partly motivated by economic factors. Recovery from the Great Depression lowered the unemployment rate, so "work-shy" elements would be arrested to keep others working harder. At the same time, Himmler was also focusing on exploiting prisoners' labor within the camp system. Hitler's architect, Albert Speer, had grand plans for creating monumental Nazi architecture. The SS company German Earth and Stone Works (DEST) was set up with funds from Speer's agency for exploiting prisoner labour to extract building materials. Flossenbürg and Mauthausen had been built adjacent to quarries, and DEST also set up brickworks at Buchenwald and Sachsenhausen.

Political prisoners were also arrested in larger numbers, including Jehovah's Witnesses and German émigrés who returned home. Czech and Austrian anti-Nazis were arrested after the annexation of their countries in 1938 and 1939. Jews were also increasingly targeted, with 2,000 Viennese Jews arrested after the Nazi annexation. After the Kristallnacht pogrom in November 1938, 26,000 Jewish men were deported to concentration camps following mass arrests, overwhelming the capacity of the system. These prisoners were subject to unprecedented abuse leading to hundreds of deaths—more people died at Dachau in the four months after Kristallnacht than in the previous five years. Most of the Jewish prisoners were soon released, often after promising to emigrate.

World War II
At the end of August 1939, prisoners of Flossenbürg, Sachsenhausen, and other concentration camps were murdered as part of false flag attacks staged by Germany to justify the invasion of Poland. During the war, the camps became increasingly brutal and lethal due to the plans of the Nazi leadership: most victims died in the second half of the war. Five new camps were opened between the start of the war and the end of 1941: Neuengamme (early 1940), outside of Hamburg; Auschwitz (June 1940), which initially operated as a concentration camp for Polish resistance activists; Gross-Rosen (May 1941) in Silesia; and Natzweiler (May 1941) in territory annexed from France. The first satellite camps were also established, administratively subordinated to one of the main camps. The number of prisoners tripled from 21,000 in August 1939 to around 70,000 to 80,000 in early 1942. This expansion was driven by the demand for forced labor and later the invasion of the Soviet Union; new camps were sent up near quarries (Natzweiler and Gross-Rosen) or brickworks (Neuengamme).

In April 1941, the high command of the SS ordered the murder of ill and exhausted prisoners who could no longer work (especially those deemed racially inferior). Victims were selected by camp personnel or traveling doctors, and were removed from the camps to be murdered in euthanasia centers. By April 1942, when the operation finished, at least 6,000 and as many as 20,000 people had been killed—the first act of systematic killing in the camp system. Beginning in August 1941, selected Soviet prisoners of war were killed within the concentration camps, usually within a few days of their arrival. By mid-1942, when the operation finished, at least 34,000 Soviet prisoners had been murdered. At Auschwitz, the SS used Zyklon B to kill Soviet prisoners in improvised gas chambers.

In 1942, the emphasis of the camps shifted to the war effort; by 1943, two-thirds of prisoners were employed by war industries. The death rate skyrocketed with an estimated half of the 180,000 prisoners admitted between July and November 1942 dying by the end of that interval. Orders to reduce deaths in order to spare inmate productivity had little effect in practice. During the second half of the war, Auschwitz swelled in size—fueled by the deportation of hundreds of thousands of Jews—and became the center of the camp system. It was the deadliest concentration camp and Jews sent there faced a virtual death sentence even if they were not immediately killed, as most were. In August 1943, 74,000 of the 224,000 registered prisoners in all SS concentration camps were in Auschwitz. In 1943 and early 1944, additional concentration camps—Riga in Latvia, Kovno in Lithuania, Vaivara in Estonia, and Kraków-Plaszów in Poland—were converted from ghettos or labor camps; these camps were populated almost entirely by Jewish prisoners. Along with the new main camps, many satellite camps were set up to more effectively leverage prisoner labor for the war effort.

Organization

Beginning in the mid-1930s, the camps were organized according to the following structure: commandant/adjutant, political department, protective custody camp, camp doctor, and guard command. In November 1940, the IKL came under the control of the SS Main Command Office and the Reich Security Main Office (RSHA) took on the responsibility of detaining and releasing concentration camp prisoners. In 1942, the IKL was subordinated to the SS Main Economic and Administrative Office (SS-WVHA) to improve the camps' integration into the war economy. Despite changes in the structure, the IKL remained directly responsible to Himmler.

The camps under the IKL were guarded by members of the SS-Totenkopfverbande ("deaths' head"). The guards were housed in barracks adjacent to the camp and their duties were to guard the perimeter of the camp as well as work details. They were officially forbidden from entering the camps, although this rule was not followed. Towards the end of the 1930s, the SS-Totenkopfverbande expanded its operations and set up military units, which followed the Einsatzgruppen death squads and massacred Polish Jews as well as Soviet prisoners of war. Older general SS personnel, and those wounded or disabled, replaced those assigned to combat duties. As the war progressed, a more diverse group was recruited to guard the expanding camp system, including female guards (who were not part of the SS). During the second half of the war, army and air force personnel were recruited, making up as many as 52 percent of guards by January 1945. The manpower shortage was reduced by relying on guard dogs and delegating some duties to prisoners. Corruption was widespread.

Most had joined the Nazi movement by September 1931 and were offered full-time employment in 1933. SS leaders typically lived with their wives and children near the camps where they worked, often engaging prisoners for domestic labor. Perpetration by this leadership was based on their tight social bonds, a perceived common sense that the aims of the system were good, as well as the opportunity for material gain.

Prisoners

 
Before World War II, most prisoners in the concentration camps were Germans. After the expansion of Nazi Germany, people from countries occupied by the Wehrmacht were targeted and detained in concentration camps. In Western Europe, arrests focused on resistance fighters and saboteurs, but in Eastern Europe arrests included mass roundups aimed at the implementation of Nazi population policy and the forced recruitment of workers. This led to a predominance of Eastern Europeans, especially Poles, who made up the majority of the population of some camps. By the end of the war, only 5 to 10 percent of the camp population was "Reich Germans" from Germany or Austria. In late 1941, many Soviet prisoners of war were transferred to special annexes of the concentration camps. Intended as a labor reserve, they were deliberately subject to mass starvation. 

Most Jews who were persecuted and killed during the Holocaust were never prisoners in concentration camps. Significant numbers of Jews were imprisoned beginning in November 1938 because of Kristallnacht, after which they were always overrepresented as prisoners. During the height of the Holocaust from 1941 to 1943, the Jewish population of the concentration camps was low. Extermination camps for the mass murder of Jews—Kulmhof, Belzec, Sobibor, and Treblinka—were set up outside the concentration camp system. The existing IKL camps Auschwitz and Majdanek gained additional function as extermination camps. After mid-1943, some forced-labor camps for Jews and some Nazi ghettos were converted into concentration camps. Other Jews entered the concentration camp system after being deported to Auschwitz. Despite many deaths, as many as 200,000 Jews survived the war inside the camp system.

Conditions

Conditions worsened after the outbreak of war due to reduction in food, worsening housing, and increase in work. Deaths from disease and malnutrition increased, outpacing other causes of death. However, the food provided was usually sufficient to sustain life. Life in the camps has often been depicted as a Darwinian struggle for survival, although some mutual aid existed. Individual efforts to survive, sometimes at others' expense, could hamper the aggregate survival rate.

The influx of non-German prisoners from 1939 changed the previous hierarchy based on triangle to one based on nationality. Jews, Slavic prisoners, and Spanish Republicans were targeted for especially harsh treatment which led to a high mortality rate during the first half of the war. In contrast, Reich Germans enjoyed favorable treatment compared to other nationalities. 

A minority of prisoners obtained substantially better treatment than the rest because they were prisoner functionaries (mostly Germans) or skilled laborers. Prisoner functionaries served at the whim of the SS and could be dismissed for insufficient strictness. As a result, sociologist Wolfgang Sofsky emphasizes that "They took over the role of the SS in order to prevent SS encroachment" and other prisoners remembered them for their brutality.

Forced labor

Hard labor was a fundamental component of the concentration camp system and an aspect in the daily life of prisoners. However, the forced labor deployment was largely determined by external political and economic factors that drove demand for labor. During the first years of the camps, unemployment was high and prisoners were forced to perform economically valueless but strenuous tasks, such as farming on moorland (such as at Esterwegen). Other prisoners had to work on constructing and expanding the camps. In the years before World War II, quarrying and bricklaying for the SS company DEST played a central role in prisoner labor. Despite prisoners' increasing economic importance, conditions declined; prisoners were seen as expendable so each influx of prisoners was followed by increasing death rate.

Private sector cooperation remained marginal to the overall concentration camp system for the first half of the war. After the failure to take Moscow in late 1941, the demand for armaments increased. The WVHA sought out partnerships with private industry and Speer's Armaments Ministry. In September 1942, Himmler and Speer agreed to use prisoners in armaments production and to repair damage from Allied bombing. Local authorities and private companies could hire prisoners at a fixed daily cost. This decision paved the way for the establishment of many subcamps located near workplaces. More workers were obtained through transfers from prisons and forced labor programs, causing the prisoner population to double twice by mid-1944. Subcamps where prisoners did construction work had significantly higher death rates than those that worked in munitions manufacture. By the end of the war, main camps were functioning more and more as transfer stations from which prisoners were redirected to subcamps.

At their peak in 1945, concentration camp prisoners made up 3 percent of workers in Germany. Historian Marc Buggeln estimates that no more than 1 percent of the labor for Germany's arms production came from concentration camp prisoners.

Public perception

Arrests of Germans in 1933 were often accompanied by public humiliation or beatings. If released, prisoners might return home with visible marks of abuse or psychological breakdown. Using a "dual strategy of publicity and secrecy", the regime directed terror both at the direct victim as well as the entire society in order to eliminate its opponents and deter resistance. Beginning in March 1933, detailed reports on camp conditions were published in the press. Nazi propaganda demonized the prisoners as race traitors, sexual degenerates, and criminals and presented the camps as sites of re-education. After 1933, reports in the press were scarce but larger numbers of people were arrested and people who interacted with the camps, such as those who registered deaths, could make conclusions about the camp conditions and discuss with acquaintances. 

The visibility of the camps heightened during the war due to increasing prisoner numbers, the establishment of many subcamps in proximity to German civilians, and the use of labor deployments outside the camps. These subcamps, often established in town centers in such locations as schools, restaurants, barracks, factory buildings, or military camps, were joint ventures between industry and the SS. An increasing number of German civilians interacted with the camps: entrepreneurs and landowners provided land or services, doctors decided which prisoners were healthy enough to continue working, foremen oversaw labor deployments, and administrators helped with logistics. SS construction brigades were in demand by municipalities to clear bomb debris and rebuild. For the prisoners, chances of survival rarely improved despite the contact with the outside world, although those few Germans who tried to help did not encounter punishment. Germans were often shocked to see the reality of the concentration camps up close, but reluctant to aid the prisoners because of fear that they would be imprisoned as well. Others found the poor state of the prisoners to confirm Nazi propaganda about them.

Historian Robert Gellately argues that "the Germans generally turned out to be proud and pleased that Hitler and his henchmen were putting away certain kinds of people who did not fit in, or who were regarded as 'outsiders', 'asocials', 'useless eaters', or 'criminals. According to historian Karola Fings, fear of arrest did not undermine public support for the camps because Germans saw the prisoners rather than the guards as criminals. She writes that demand for SS construction brigades "points to general acceptance of the concentration camps".

Statistics

There were 27 main camps and, according to historian Nikolaus Wachsmann's estimate, more than 1,100 satellite camps. This is a cumulative figure that counts all the subcamps that existed at one point; historian Karin Orth estimates the number of subcamps to have been 186 at the end of 1943, 341 or more in June 1944, and at least 662 in January 1945.

The camps were concentrated in prewar Germany and to a lesser extent territory annexed to Germany. No camps were built on the territory of Germany's allies that enjoyed even nominal independence. Each camp housed either men, women, or a mixed population. Women's camps were mostly for armaments production and located primarily in northern Germany, Thuringia, or the Sudetenland, while men's camps had a wider geographical distribution. Sex segregation decreased over the course of the war and mixed camps predominated outside of Germany's prewar borders.

Around 1.65 million people were registered prisoners in the camps, of whom, according to Wagner, nearly a million died during their imprisonment. Historian Adam Tooze counts the number of survivors at no more than 475,000, calculating that at least 1.1 million of the registered prisoners must have died. According to his estimate, at least 800,000 of the murdered prisoners were not Jewish. In addition to the registered prisoners who died, a million Jews were gassed upon arriving in Auschwitz; including these victims, the total death toll is estimated at 1.8 to more than two million. Most of the fatalities occurred during the second half of World War II, including at least a third of the 700,000 prisoners who were registered as of January 1945.

Death marches and liberation

Major evacuations of the camps occurred in mid-1944 from the Baltics and eastern Poland, January 1945 from western Poland and Silesia, and in March 1945 from concentration camps in Germany. Both Jewish and non-Jewish prisoners died in large numbers as a consequence of these death marches.

Many prisoners died after liberation due to their poor physical condition.

The liberation of the camps—documented by the Western Allies in 1945—has played a prominent part in perception of the camp system as a whole.

Legacy

Since their liberation, the Nazi concentration camp system has come to symbolize violence and terror in the modern world.
After the war, most Germans rejected the crimes associated with the concentration camps, while denying any knowledge or responsibility. A few perpetrators were put on trial after the war.

Accounts of the concentration camps—both condemnatory and sympathetic—were publicized outside of Germany before World War II. Many survivors testified about their experiences or wrote memoirs after the war. Some of these accounts have become internationally famous, such as Primo Levi's 1947 book, If This is a Man. The concentration camps have been the subject of historical writings since Eugen Kogon's 1946 study,  ("The SS State"). Substantial research did not begin until the 1980s. Scholarship has focused on the fate of groups of prisoners, the organization of the camp system, and aspects such as forced labor. As late as the 1990s, German local and economic history omitted mention of the camps or presented them as exclusively the responsibility of the SS. Two scholarly encyclopedias of the concentration camps have been published: Der Ort des Terrors and Encyclopedia of Camps and Ghettos. According to Caplan and Wachsmann, "more books have been published on the Nazi camps than any other site of detention and terror in history".

Stone argues that the Nazi concentration camp system inspired similar atrocities by other regimes, including the Argentine military junta during the Dirty War, the Pinochet regime in Chile, and Pitești Prison in the Romanian People's Republic.

Sources

Notes

Citations

Sources

 

 
Concentration
SS Main Economic and Administrative Office
Total institutions